Tahnoun Bin Mohamed Stadium is a multi-purpose stadium in Al Ain, United Arab Emirates. It is currently used mostly for football matches and is one of the home grounds of Al Ain Club. The stadium holds approximately 15,000 people and was opened on 21 August 1987.This stadium played host to two AFC Champions League final matches one in 2003 and the other in 2005. In 30/5/2006 the Ittihad and Al Khaleej newspapers of the UAE stated that a new stadium would be built in the city of Al Ain and would be completed within the next five years.

External links
 A virtual tour of the Al Ain stadiums

Al Ain FC
Football venues in the United Arab Emirates
Multi-purpose stadiums in the United Arab Emirates
Sports venues in the Emirate of Abu Dhabi